Simon Bala (died 2008) was the Anglican Bishop of Kubwa in Abuja Province  of the Church of Nigeria.

He was consecrated as the pioneer Bishop of Kubwa on 13 March  2005; he had previously been Bishop of Gusau.

He died in 2008, and was succeeded as bishop by Duke Akamisoko.

References 

2008 deaths
Anglican bishops of Kubwa
Anglican bishops of Gusau
21st-century Anglican bishops in Nigeria
Nigerian Anglicans